Blackfire (born Princess Komand'r) is a supervillain appearing in American comic books published by DC Comics. She is the older sister and archenemy of Teen Titans member Koriand'r/Starfire and of lesser-known youngest sibling Crown Prince Ryand'r/Darkfire.

The character made her live adaptation debut in the DC Universe / HBO Max series Titans, portrayed by Damaris Lewis.

Publication history
Blackfire first appears in The New Teen Titans #22 and was created by Marv Wolfman and George Pérez.

Fictional character biography
Princess Komand'r is the firstborn child and eldest daughter of Tamaran's royal family. The first princess born in over a century, she should have been courted and showered with honors. On the day she was born, the Citadel Empire attacked and destroyed the western Tamaranean city of Kysarr and killed three thousand citizens in her name. Though she was in no way at fault for what had happened, Komand'r was, for all time, inextricably linked with that terrible day. To make matters worse, Princess Komand'r was crippled by a childhood illness that left her unable to harness ultraviolet light into energy to fly like most Tamaraneans. Because of Princess Komand'r's naturally grim disposition, a stark contrast to the royal family's generally contented outlook, the subjects of Tamaran hated her. As a result, though first in the line of succession, she was denied her birthright to be the next Crown Princess of Tamaran to maintain the respect and prestige of the royal family. Her privileges, honors, and her royal style and dignity were transferred to her younger sister, Princess Koriand'r (who would later become known as Starfire) and their long-lost younger brother crown Prince Ryand'r (known as Wildfire). Inwardly, Princess Komand'r's rage grew and her resentment turned to hatred for her own world, her people, her family, and lastly her younger sister who, in Princess Komand'r's eyes, made the fateful mistake of being born. Princess Komand'r's hatred continued and intensified when she and her sister were sent, per Tamaran's warlike custom, for warrior training with the Warlords of Okaara. Princess Komand'r's true feelings were exposed when during a sparring exercise she attempted to kill her younger sister. As a result, she was expelled by the Warlords. Humiliated by her own transgression, Princess Komand'r swore vengeance and joined the Citadel, quickly rising through their ranks to become a warrior-maiden fighting against the forces of her own world and, ultimately, her own family.

Komand'r later betrayed her home world with detailed information about Tamaran's planetary defenses to the Citadel. They conquered Tamaran with ease, and the surrender conditions included the enslavement of Koriand'r. Koriand'r was never permitted to return, since that would mean the Citadel would devastate the planet for abrogating the treaty. Komand'r was her sister's master and made the most of her younger sister's bondage with years of horrific servitude and torture. When Kori killed one of her rapists, Komand'r decided to execute her as punishment, but not before the sisters were attacked and captured by the Psions. Psions, largely a species of sadistic scientists, performed a deadly experiment on both of the sisters to see just how much ultraviolet energy their Tamaranian bodies could absorb before exploding from the overload. During the procedure, Komand'r's forces attacked the Psion ship to rescue her and while the Psions were distracted, Kori broke free with her newly developed starbolts, highly destructive blasts of bright pink-colored ultraviolet energy, which were a result of the experimentation. Against her better judgment she decided to free Komand'r, who was still absorbing more and more ultraviolet energy. However, far from grateful, Komand'r had struck her younger sister down with the same (but much stronger) lilac-colored ultraviolet energy and had her restrained for later execution. Kori escaped and stole a spaceship to planet Earth, where she met a young group of heroes-Robin, Wonder Girl, Changeling, Raven, Cyborg and Kid Flash- and helped form the new Teen Titans.

Princess Komand'r appeared in the Rann-Thanagar War limited series, during which she killed Hawkwoman in her pursuit of a New Tamaran. She formed an uneasy alliance with the surviving players of the war in order to deal with more pressing concerns (Infinite Crisis). She was not seen during the Crisis series itself, but was featured in Hawkgirl and Hawkman comics as well as in JSA: Classified, attempting to kill Hawkman and Hawkgirl in order to further her own plans in the goings on & aftermath of the war. The Hawks defeated Princess Komand'r, after which Hawkman used Psion technology to strip the evil extraterrestrial princess of all of her abilities.

Blackfire has later resurfaced in The Outsiders (vol. 3) #31-32 (Infinite Crisis tie-in issues) with her powers already having been restored by the Psions and enhanced to the point of gaining flight. Further along the line in R.E.B.E.L.S. (vol. 2), When Vril Dox moved the planet Rann into the location formerly held by Tamaran in the Vega System, Blackfire arrived with her army in attempt to seize the planet for her own people. Dox was able to quickly stop the hostilities, however, and brokered a treaty allowing Blackfire and her people to settle on the uninhabited southern continent of Rann. During these events, Blackfire gained a newfound sense of respect for Dox, realizing his egocentric personality was very similar to her own. The two went on an unofficial date disguised as a diplomatic dinner and after Dox was captured by Starro the Conqueror, Blackfire joined forces with Adam Strange and other members of L.E.G.I.O.N. to rescue him. Blackfire then subsequently claimed Dox as her king consort.

The New 52

In The New 52 (a 2011 reboot of the DC Comics universe), some people's origins and personalities have been changed to an unknown degree. While not at first referred to by name, it is said Starfire's sister sold her for the safety of their planet. It is revealed that a parasitic race known as the Blight has taken over Tamaran, their purpose unknown and Koriand'r fears the worst for her sister. Komand'r appears via flashback as her sister talks about their relationship, saying that they rarely get along and that Kori is embittered toward Komand'r and the people of Tamaran for letting her be enslaved. After Kori fought her way free, she was praised as a hero and given a ship named the Starfire by Komand'r, but the rift between the girls was still there. Komand'r appears to a captured Roy Harper and appears to be working with or under the Blight. Roy's capture, however, was revealed to be a mission to rescue Komand'r, as he successfully teleported her back onto the Starfire.

The royal sisters reconcile in a teary conversation as Kori forgives her elder sister and the issue ends with the sisters preparing to take back Tamaran by themselves. Kom and Kori fight through the hordes of the Blight with Jason, Roy and a few of the members of Kori's ship. Komand'r is stabbed in the back by a spear thrown by the Blight's leader. Kori's emotions send an energetic shock wave, wiping out everything around her. When the smoke clears she holds the defeated Blight leader. After the battle, Princess Koriand'r is next to the throne and Crown Princess Komand'r stumbles next to her. She asks Kori to stay, but realizes she cannot. They hug and Crown Princess Komand'r gives them a ship to get back to Earth.

Powers and abilities 
Princess Komand'r (Blackfire) is a Tamaranean like her younger sister; her physiology is designed to constantly absorb and control pure ultraviolet radiation into destructive and powerful bolts of energy which she calls "blackbolts." The radiation is then converted to pure energy which enabled her incredible feats of strength, speed, durability and the like; all on par or possibly greater than those of Starfire, having fought and bested her many times. This is not the case for flight, however, as she suffered a sickness in her youth which stripped her of this ability, but she found other means of circumventing this handicap. Being of royal blood and having fought in many wars, Komand'r also boasts impressive mortal combat skills superior even to her sibling, be it unarmed or with weaponry on hand, having battled and bested the likes of her own sibling (who is also a veteran warrior) and Thanagarian heroes Kartar Hol, Shayera Thal and Shayera Hol either in single combat or in pairs and win, as well as holding her own against the likes of a weakened Starro in his humanoid form (with some assistance from Starfire). Having undergone the same experiments conducted upon her by the Psions, Blackfire too has the ability to release her absorbed energy into incredibly powerful blasts called "starbolts". Hers by comparison, however, are considerably stronger enabling her to overpower her sister's starbolt energy. For a time Blackfire was stripped of all her powers by Hawkman using the same technology the Psions used in their experimentation upon her. Even without these strengths Komand'r is still a political activist and capable leader, being Queen of Tamaran she has access to a great many facilities, be it governmental or military in nature. Like any good politician, Blackfire is a skilled manipulator, able to utilize fear and misdirection to her advantage; even forging alliances with others despite her incredibly sociopathic nature.

When her natural abilities were restored in full, however, she not only regained all the natural Tamaranian abilities  she initially lacked, Princess Blackfire even gained a capacity she lacked, namely faster-than-light aviary travel. This accommodates her resilience against heat, radiation and the harsh vacuum of outer space coupled with a solar powered self-sustenance eliminating the need to eat, drink, sleep or an atmosphere to breathe, which enables the evil queen to travel interstellar distances unaided, though she can take in sustenance if she desires too. She can also actively absorb stellar and UV energy like her sister but has a unique ability her counterpart does not, which is the active absorption of stellar energies to copy off new abilities from another person, like when she drew energy directly from Starfire emulating her omni-directional energy burst; due to her greater stellar energy absorption abilities, however, Blackfire can recover faster than her sister when she uses her powers in such a way. Blackfire, like all Tamaraneans, can assimilate languages through physical contact with another person and is more fluent in the English language of humans than Koriand'r. She also does not need to eat or drink; though she can if unusually low on ultraviolet energy.

In both animated shows, Blackfire can project her lilac-colored ultraviolet energy reserves as optic blasts, revealed to be facet received after her changes phase, in the episode Betrothed she had come into possession of a mystical artifact dubbed the Jewel of Charta, which greatly magnified her abilities tens of times greater, turning her normally lilac-colored "blackbolts" a bright red. Her enhanced durability and invulnerability were amplified as well, to the point of withstanding a barrage of Starfire's bright green starbolts and appear unscathed.

She is also a master manipulator and deceiver, capable of using kind and friendly words to achieve her vile goals.

In the live-action series Titans, she is able to freely take possession of anyone she sees fit by injecting them with a microchip.

Earth One
In Teen Titans: Earth One, Blackfire is a failed Star Labs clone headed up by Niles Caulder to defeat the Titans.

In other media

Animated

Teen Titans

Blackfire appears in the 2003 animated series Teen Titans, voiced by Hynden Walch (the same actress who voices Starfire). This version is depicted as a young woman and she's capable of flight, unlike her comic counterpart, and first appeared in the first-season episode "Sisters" (the second episode of the series), where Blackfire comes to Earth to visit Starfire. However, it is soon revealed that Blackfire is actually an infamous galactic criminal, and she has actually come to Earth in an attempt to frame her younger sister for her crimes. Fortunately, her plan was thwarted and the result ended in an epic fight between sisters. Their battle is interrupted when Blackfire is arrested by Centauri police forces. She vows that she will get out of galactic jail and get even with Starfire.

In the episode "Betrothed", Blackfire is revealed to have "got bored" and escaped galactic jail, and in control of Tamaran as the Empress. She used her authority to have Starfire married to a swamp alien in return for the magical Jewel of Charta, under the guise that Tamaran would be destroyed if Starfire did not comply. The Teen Titans soon discover that the elder sister's plan is a hoax, and Starfire proceeds to challenge Blackfire to a duel for the Tamaranean throne. The Jewel of Charta was shown to greatly enhance Blackfire's abilities, until Starfire took the jewel by force and crushed it. After Blackfire was defeated by Starfire, Blackfire is then forced into exile, presumably one of the swamp moons of Drenfax 4.

The New Teen Titans animated short "Blackfire's Babysitter" depicts Blackfire as having quadruplets with the swamp alien she had attempted to force Starfire into marrying.

Teen Titans Go!
Princess Komand'r (Blackfire in Earth's English language) appears as a supporting character in Teen Titans Go!, again voiced by Hynden Walch. She first appears in the Season 2 premiere, "Mr. Butt". After getting into trouble with the Galactic Police again, Blackfire seeks refuge with Starfire. After Starfire gave Blackfire delighted hugs, Blackfire is introduced to the rest of the Teen Titans, to which her little sister's teammates took an immediate disliking to her. After Blackfire flirts with Robin, the Titans try to tell Starfire that Blackfire was one of the most wanted criminals. Starfire then claims that she was going to give Blackfire one more chance, but if Blackfire crushed Starfire's sisterly feelings once more, a thoroughly enraged Starfire would destroy her. After Blackfire grudgingly does "sisterly stuff" with Starfire (making her little sister look exactly like her), the Galactic Police find Starfire (dressed as Blackfire), and take her prisoner where Starfire, both heartbroken and revenge-torn, swears to destroy Blackfire once and for all. After learning to listen to a sister's problems, and how to live with a younger sibling, Blackfire felt guilt for her horrible actions toward her younger sister, and becomes a better older sister. In the midst of this, a thoroughly enraged and revenge-torn Starfire breaks into Titans Tower, bent on destroying Blackfire once and for all. Blackfire tries to help with sisterly loving actions, but Starfire makes it clear that she would not fall for that again. Blackfire finally gets her sister to stop momentarily by showing the doll that she had stolen from Starfire as a five-year-old child, and apologizing for it, also stating 'I've changed, now.'. Starfire disintegrates the doll and says "So have I", before shooting Blackfire with a bright green laser eye blast. Later, in Titans Tower, Blackfire and Starfire appear in the main lounge, causing the Titans to jump up and ask how it went. After Blackfire faints from exhaustion and pain, Starfire cheerfully states that they had "worked things out".

Finally being given major speaking roles since her debut episode, Blackfire reappears in the Season 5 two-part episode "Girls Night In" as the "new alien threat" coming to Earth, having a major role since her debut episode in the Season 2 premiere. Raven and Starfire, alongside their fellow girls, fight Starfire's elder sister in an all-out battle to stop her from conquering Earth. Starfire still wants to do sisterly bonding, obliviously regardless to her elder sister's intense dislike and hatred of her. Doing her favorite game of "Truth or Death", Blackfire further shatters her younger sister's heart by stating the hard truth: That she wished she did not have a sister.
At this, the heartbroken and furious Starfire combines with her fellow girls - Raven, Bumblebee, Ravager, Jinx and Terra- and beats Blackfire once again by pushing her into the portal where her army was coming through. 

In "We're Off to Get Awards", she appeared as a cameo when she was awarded "Outstanding Alien Princess from Planet Tamaran" which infuriated Starfire.

DC Super Hero Girls
Hynden Walch reprises her role as Blackfire in the web series DC Super Hero Girls as a supporting character. She appears in "The Day of Funship", where she and Starfire are having some sisterly fun, which she gets bored with. At the zoo, she and Starfire use a Tamaranian nursery rhyme to defeat King Shark. Blackfire is leaving to return to Koragar Academy, but promises to see her younger sister for Tamaran Sovereignty Day, and admitted that she did have fun hanging out with her "kinifster" after all. 

Her final appearance was in the two-part Season 4 episode "Tamaranean Dance Club", she appeared as cameos to do the traditional Tamaranian dance (translates to"domination battle" in Tamaranian) against her overly joyful younger sister, Bumblebee, Wonder Woman, Katana, Supergirl and Batgirl, who defeated her and her fellow Korugar Academy students.

Live-action

Titans

Blackfire appears in the second season of the live-action television series Titans as a supporting character, portrayed by Damaris Lewis. In this version, as seen in the episode "Atonement", she has succeeded in seizing the Tamaranean throne and murdering the entire royal court, including her own parents. In this iteration, Princess Komand'r is the younger sister to Starfire. Komand'r also sends a mind-controlling parasite to infect a Tamaraean emissary, Faddei, to manipulate her younger sister into returning home. When her game of deception is discovered by Kory, she appears as a hologram and expresses the intense resentment and jealousy she had always felt towards Koriand'r and her closer and more loving relationship with their parents. When Kory declares that she is coming for her, Komand'r merely replies "good" and detonates a bomb to destroy her sister's ship, leaving Kory stranded on Earth yet again. In the season two finale, "Nightwing", she uses another parasite to take over a woman and alter her body to resemble her own.

Many months later, in an episode bearing her English name, Komand'r had somehow been released from the human woman she was controlling, overpowered and detained by Earth's scientists due to her hostile, sadistic nature. Despite her weakened and powerless state, the rogue Tamaranian princess still managed to activate some of her natural mental/psionic/extrasensory abilities to implant visions of her whereabouts into her younger sister's mind and take over her for a time. Once Kory and Garfield had discovered the underground facility, Blackfire and Starfire had a talk about the other always having one up over the other ever since their girlhood. Stating that imprisonment on such a "backwater planet" is dishonorable, Blackfire had told her sister to do away with her, but Kory refused. The sisterly reunion quickly escalated into a brawl with Starfire gaining the upper hand and seemingly knocking her sister out cold. Once outside her cell, a furious Blackfire yells at Starfire, assuring her that the reason for her present actions are all because of Starfire herself: Of her "disloyalty" to her own sister, and how she, Blackfire, had always deserved a sister who would always fight with and stand by her but never did.

As Starfire and Beast Boy are about to leave, the scientist informs Starfire and Beast Boy about his decision to keep Blackfire until she finally perishes, which would take centuries in Earth years as Tamaranians possesses longevity and a slowed aging process. Disliking the idea of even her homicidal sister being caged like a pet for the remainder of her natural life, Kory releases her from her confinement and threatens the scientist to get out of her way, disregarding his claim that Blackfire belongs to the United States government, and that releasing her makes her the Teen Titans' problem, which Starfire gladly accepts. Blackfire then reluctantly decides to go in a car driven by Beast Boy, with Starfire in the front seat. She forms an intimate relationship with Conner, but ultimately returns home to Tamaran.

Films

Justice League vs. Teen Titans
In Justice League vs. Teen Titans when a frustrated Starfire is complaining about Damian Wayne's negative behavior to his adoptive brother Nightwing, she says that he reminds her of her sister.

Teen Titans: The Judas Contract
Princess Komand'r/Blackfire is again mentioned/referenced in Teen Titans: The Judas Contract when Starfire was rescued from the Gordanians by Robin, Kid Flash, Arsenal, Beast Boy, and Bumblebee (in a flashback which took place five years ago). She revealed that Blackfire had staged a coup and seized the throne, forcing Koriand'r to flee Tamaran and land on Planet Earth. In the present, Beast Boy had told Terra that Starfire was a refugee being stalked by her homicidal sister.

DC Super Hero Girls: Intergalactic Games
With Hynden Walch reprising her role, Blackfire debuts in DC Super Hero Girls: Intergalactic Games, the second film based on the animated series. As one of the students at Koragar Academy, she came to Earth to beat Super Hero High School in the games, even her own sister. She expressed her dislike at Starfire's overly optimistic attitude and at her sister "lowering herself to help humans". She is offended of mere mortals passing themselves off as "superheroes" such as Batgirl. As the night wore on, she later stayed behind to help Starfire fight the robots created by Lena Luthor. She combined her stronger lilac blackbolt energies with Starfire's bright green ones and dismantled them with ease, to which Starfire said that they were at their very strongest when using "the blast of togetherness". She combined her purple ultraviolet energy-projecting (blackbolt) abilities with her sister's bright green starbolts and several other superheroes to supercharge Platinum.

Video games

Injustice 2
Blackfire is mentioned by Starfire in some of her intros battling various villains and heroes in Injustice 2. Doctor Fate had stated that "your sister's specter haunts you", to which Starfire replied that Princess Komand'r had betrayed her and all of Tamaran. There was another duel, in which Starfire was fighting a fellow female Tamaranean whom she had called her "Komand'r" whose ultraviolet energy bolts were the same bright green color as her own in contrast to being bright purple. This version had said that she was from the multiverse.

Stellar Showdown
Blackfire appears in the online game of Teen Titans Go!. Angry that she was not invited to her younger sister's birthday party, she arrived at Titans Tower and demanded that the Titans face her.

Miscellaneous

Batman: The Brave the Bold 
Blackfire makes a cameo appearance in issue #9 of the tie-in comic book series to Batman: The Brave and the Bold as one of the villains defeated by Hawkgirl.

Teen Titans Go! 
In the 49th issue, "Wrong Place, Wrong Time", there is an alternate universe where Starfire's evil counterpart is Blackfire of the Teen Tyrants. She also appears in the issues "It's How You Play the Game!" and "Wildfire".

References

External links

 
 Blackfire at Spider-Bob.com

Comics characters introduced in 1982
Characters created by George Pérez
Characters created by Marv Wolfman
Comics articles that need to differentiate between fact and fiction
Villains in animated television series
DC Comics aliens
DC Comics characters who can move at superhuman speeds
DC Comics characters with superhuman senses
DC Comics characters with superhuman strength
DC Comics extraterrestrial supervillains
DC Comics female supervillains
DC Comics martial artists
Fictional princesses
Fictional adolescents
Fictional characters with absorption or parasitic abilities
Fictional characters with energy-manipulation abilities
Fictional characters with fire or heat abilities
Fictional characters with nuclear or radiation abilities
Fictional characters with slowed ageing